Michael or Mike Weaver may refer to:

 Michael Weaver (golfer) (born 1991), American amateur golfer
 Mike Weaver (boxer) (born 1952), former boxer and WBA heavyweight champion
 Mike Weaver (ice hockey) (born 1978), Canadian ice hockey defenceman 
 Mike Weaver (politician), American politician and retired military officer

See also
 Mick Weaver (born 1944), English session musician